The Bataan Nuclear Power Plant is a nuclear power plant on the Bataan Peninsula,  west of Manila, Philippines. Completed but never fueled, it is located on a  government reservation at Napot Point in Morong, Bataan. It was the Philippines' only attempt at building a nuclear power plant. It was mothballed due to safety concerns in the wake of the Chernobyl disaster in Ukraine in 1986 and issues regarding corruption. Additionally, The Letter of Instruction No. 957, s. 1979 was signed by the late President Ferdinand Marcos and was published on November 13, 1979, in which it states that the continuation of the construction was not possible due to potential hazards to the health and safety of the public.

Background 
The Philippine nuclear program started in 1958 with the creation of the Philippine Atomic Energy Commission (PAEC) under Republic Act 2067. Under a regime of martial law, Philippine President Ferdinand Marcos in July 1973 announced the decision to build a nuclear power plant. A presidential committee was set up to secure funding for two 620 megawatt nuclear reactors for the energy needs of Luzon. Marcos reasoned that this was in response to the 1973 oil crisis, as the Middle East oil embargo had put a heavy strain on the Philippine economy.

Controversy 
Two proposals were submitted by General Electric and Westinghouse Electric. General Electric submitted a proposal containing detailed specifications of the nuclear plant and estimated it to cost US$700 million. On the other hand, Westinghouse submitted a lower cost estimate of US$500 million, but the proposal did not contain any detail or specification. The presidential committee tasked to oversee the project preferred General Electric's proposal, but this was overruled by Marcos in June 1974, who signed a letter of intent awarding the project to Westinghouse, despite the absence of any specifications on their proposal. Similarly, Marcos disregarded the advice of the National Power Corporation, the government-owned and controlled corporation responsible for electricity in the country.

The project was plagued with problems throughout construction, including location, welding, cabling, pipes and valves, permits, and kickbacks, as well as setbacks such as the decline of Marcos's influence and the incident at the Three Mile Island nuclear reactor. By March 1975, Westinghouse's cost estimate ballooned to US$1.2 billion without much explanation. The final cost was $2.2 billion for a single reactor producing half the power of the original proposal. Many problems identified in earlier stages remained throughout construction, as reported by inspectors though denied by Westinghouse. To provide context, the Philippine economy in 1976 only had a GDP of US$17 billion and a government budget of US$1.5 billion, as such the burden to the economy for one single project was deemed too heavy. The BNPP would be responsible to 10% of the country's external debt.

The PCGG would later order Marcos crony Herminio Disini to return US$50.6 million in commissions he earned from the deal. Marcos on the other hand received US$80 million in kickback from the project. The Office of the Solicitor General would also file that Marcos return PHP22.2 billion to the government for his conspiracy with Disini to defraud the government. In 2021, the Supreme Court of the Philippines would order Disini, through his estate, to pay back the government over PHP1 billion in damages, affirming a 2012 Sandiganbayan decision.

Construction 
Construction on the Bataan Nuclear Power Plant began in 1976. Following the 1979 Three Mile Island accident in the United States, construction on the BNPP was stopped, and a subsequent safety inquiry into the plant revealed over 4,000 defects. Among the issues raised was that it was built near a major geological fault line and close to the then dormant Mount Pinatubo.

By 1984, when the BNPP was nearly complete, its cost had reached US$2.3 billion. Equipped with a Westinghouse light water reactor, it was designed to produce 621 megawatts of electricity.

President Ferdinand Marcos was overthrown by the People Power Revolution in February 1986. Days after the April 1986 Chernobyl disaster in what was then the Ukrainian Soviet Socialist Republic, the succeeding administration of President Corazon Aquino decided not to operate the plant. Among other considerations taken were the strong opposition from Bataan residents and Philippine citizens as well as concern over the integrity of the construction.  The Philippines experienced 8- to 12-hour rolling blackouts and power rationing from 1989 to 1993.

The government sued Westinghouse for alleged overpricing and bribery but was ultimately rejected by a United States court. Debt repayment on the plant became the country's biggest single obligation. While successive governments have looked at several proposals to convert the plant into an oil, coal, or gas-fired power station, these options have all been deemed less economically attractive in the long term than simply constructing new power stations.

Opposition 

The Bataan Nuclear Power Plant was a focal point for anti-nuclear protests in the late 1970s and 1980s. The project was criticized for being a potential threat to public health, especially since the plant was located in an earthquake zone connected to Mount Natib, a caldera volcano similar to Mount Pinatubo. According to the US Geological Survey National Earthquake Information Center, several earthquakes have occurred on Mount Natib from 1951 to 2016. Following proposals submitted in 2017 by Korea Hydro & Nuclear Power Co. Ltd. and Russia's Rosatom to rehabilitate the plant, opposition to the nuclear plant also raised concerns related to safety and health issues, reliance on imported uranium, high waste, and the steep cost of decommissioning.

History

2000s 
Despite never being commissioned, the plant has remained intact, including the nuclear reactor, and has continued to be maintained. The Philippine government completed paying off its obligations on the plant in April 2007, more than 30 years after construction began.

On January 29, 2008, Energy Secretary Angelo Reyes announced that an International Atomic Energy Agency (IAEA) eight-man team led by Akira Omoto inspected the Bataan Nuclear power station on rehabilitation prospects. In preparing their report, the IAEA made two primary recommendations. First, the power plant's status must be thoroughly evaluated by technical inspections and economic evaluations conducted by a committed group of nuclear power experts with experience in preservation management. Second, the IAEA mission advised the Philippine government on the general requirements for starting its nuclear power program, stressing that the proper infrastructure, safety standards, and knowledge be implemented. The IAEA's role did not extend to assessing whether the power plant is usable or how much the plant may cost to rehabilitate.

Plans to reactivate the plant was questioned by critics, citing the need to consider people's safety, the plant's structural defects, the fact that the plant stands near a major earthquake fault, and the large sums of money the government would need to loan to revive the plant. Critics also alleged that the Bataan Nuclear Power Plant was being revived to become another source of government corruption. Opposition to the nuclear plant's revival came from Bataan and nearby provinces.

2010s 
On February 1, 2010, NAPOCOR started evaluating the financial plan of Korea Electric Power Corporation (KEPCO), assessing that it may cost US$1 billion to rehabilitate the nuclear plant. On February 22, 2011, the Philippine government reimbursed the National Power Corporation (NAPOCOR) ₱4.2 billion (US$96 million) it spent for maintaining the Bataan Nuclear Power Plant. It requires an average of ₱40 million a year just to maintain it. In May 2011, it was announced that the plant would be turned into a tourist attraction.

In 2012, the Sandiganbayan graft court ordered entrepreneur and Marcos crony Herminio Disini to repay the Philippine government the amount of $50 million for his role in defrauding the country through the Bataan Nuclear Power Plant.

In 2016, various senators and a few media personnel inspected the Bataan Nuclear Power Plant for a possible bid to open it for public use. Inspecting senators told the media that the power plant was still in good condition. The Department of Energy was later given the go-ahead to look into the plant's rehabilitation. At least one senator has cautioned against reviving the nuclear power plant and stressed the need to consult scientists on the issue.

Citing risks associated with the presence of the Lubao Fault, an active earthquake fault running through the nearby Mount Natib, scientists have advised against reviving the nuclear plant. However, officials from the Philippine Institute of Volcanology and Seismology had declared the site of the plant is safe noting the facility's solid foundation and the dormancy of the nearby volcano Mount Natib.

In late 2017, representatives from Russia's Rosatom State Atomic Energy Corporation and Slovenia's GEN Energija went to assess the plant and make recommendations for its rehabilitation. They estimated rehabilitation costs between $3 billion to 4 billion and proposed steps for securing financing, drafting of relevant regulations, and training of technical personnel. They also recommended that the government consider constructing new nuclear power plants.

In an interview with CNN Philippines in April 2018, the Russian ambassador to the Philippines commented that he believed that revival of the plant would not be possible due to its outdated design. In contrast, Rosatom's vice president for Southeast Asia, Egor Simonov, stated that it would be possible to revive the plant, noting its "relatively good condition" despite decades of disuse. However, Simonov added that reviving the nuclear power plant may not be cost-effective.

In 2019, the Department of National Defense expressed its support for the revival of the nuclear power plant. The Philippine Nuclear Research Institute also urged the government to revive the power plant.

See also 
 Nuclear power in the Philippines
 Philippine Research Reactor-1

References

External links 
RP pays off nuclear power plant after 30 years
Government warned on reopening nuclear plant
for more information on the 2008 Philippine Energy Summit

Nuclear power plants in the Philippines
Buildings and structures in Bataan
History of Bataan